The 6th Central Military Commission (CMC) of the Workers' Party of Korea (WPK), officially the Central Military Commission of the 6th Congress of the Workers' Party of Korea, was elected by the 1st Plenary Session of the 6th Central Committee on 14 October 1980.

Members

6th Congress (1980–1993)

3rd Conference (2010–2012)

4th Conference (2012–2016)

References

Citations

Bibliography
Books:
 
 
  

Dissertations:
 

6th Central Military Commission of the Workers' Party of Korea
1980 establishments in North Korea
2016 disestablishments in North Korea